Maximiliano Rodríguez (born 26 November 1989) is an Argentine professional footballer who plays as a midfielder for Barracas Central.

Career
Rodríguez began playing for General Paz Juniors in 2006, appearing once in the 2005–06 Torneo Argentino A as they were relegated. 2007 saw Rodríguez join Bella Vista, where he played in one fixture before sealing a return to General Paz Juniors of Torneo Argentino B in 2008. A year later, Rodríguez moved across the fourth tier to Independiente. Five appearances followed. Primera C Metropolitana side Talleres signed Rodríguez in 2010. He participated in one hundred and forty-one games and scored twelve goals. In January 2015, Rodríguez was loaned to Barracas Central. He was signed permanently in 2016.

Rodríguez's first appearance as a permanent Barracas Central player came on 4 September versus San Telmo, with his first goal coming in the succeeding May against former club Talleres. He scored three goals in thirty-eight matches in 2016–17 and 2017–18.

Career statistics
.

Honours
Barracas Central
Primera B Metropolitana: 2018–19

References

External links

1989 births
Living people
Footballers from Córdoba, Argentina
Argentine footballers
Association football midfielders
Torneo Argentino A players
Torneo Argentino B players
Primera C Metropolitana players
Primera B Metropolitana players
General Paz Juniors footballers
Bella Vista de Bahía Blanca footballers
Independiente de Neuquén players
Talleres de Remedios de Escalada footballers
Barracas Central players
Deportivo Riestra players